Ernest Arthur Hill (31 March 1890 – 17 July 1943) was an Australian rules footballer who played with Richmond in the Victorian Football League (VFL).

Notes

External links 

1890 births
1943 deaths
Australian rules footballers from Victoria (Australia)
Richmond Football Club players